Martina Navratilova and Pam Shriver successfully defended their title, defeating Rosie Casals and Wendy Turnbull in the final, 6–2, 6–2 to win the ladies' doubles tennis title at the 1983 Wimbledon Championships.

Seeds
The top 8 seeds received a bye into the second round. 

  Martina Navratilova /  Pam Shriver (champions)
  Rosalyn Fairbank /  Candy Reynolds (third round)
  Jo Durie /  Anne Hobbs (semifinals)
  Hana Mandlíková /  Virginia Ruzici (second round)
  Claudia Kohde-Kilsch /  Eva Pfaff (quarterfinals)
  Rosemary Casals /  Wendy Turnbull (final)
  Barbara Potter /  Sharon Walsh (quarterfinals)
  Chris Evert Lloyd /  Billie Jean King (third round)
  Mima Jaušovec /  Kathy Jordan (quarterfinals)
  Ann Kiyomura /  Paula Smith (third round)
  Lea Antonoplis /  Barbara Jordan (third round)
  Elise Burgin /  Alycia Moulton (third round)
  Beverly Mould /  Elizabeth Sayers (first round)
  Catherine Tanvier /  Andrea Temesvári (third round)

Draw

Finals

Top half

Section 1

Section 2

Bottom half

Section 3

Section 4

References

External links

1983 Wimbledon Championships – Women's draws and results at the International Tennis Federation

Women's Doubles
1983
1983 in women's tennis
1983 in British women's sport